Bayfair Center (orig. Bay-Fair, later Bay Fair, Bayfair Mall) is a regional shopping mall and power center in San Leandro, California. It was among the first malls in the East Bay of the San Francisco Bay Area. Anchor stores are Macy's, Target, Kohl's, Staples, Old Navy, PetSmart, Bed Bath & Beyond, Cinemark, and 24 Hour Fitness.

History

Launch (1950s)
The mall construction did not begin until 1956. 

The architect (including for the interior) for the Macy's store was John Savage Bolles, who had designed Candlestick Park and also designed interiors for Macy's Hilltop Mall in Richmond, Hillsdale Shopping Center in San Mateo, and Valley Fair in San Jose, and interiors for the renovation of the Macy's Union Square San Francisco flagship store.

Macy's was the first unit to open, on August 8, 1957, with mall shops opening in the months following. On November 8, 1957, 19 new stores (besides Macy's), including a supermarket, celebrated their grand opening. 

The mall shop area (outside Macy's) was open-air and in an L-shape, split-level (i.e. on two levels, but not two stories one on top of another). It claimed to be the first shopping center in the Western United States to be built across two stories.

Expansion (1960s–1990s)
The mall continued to expand, and a new department store anchor, Montgomery Ward opened a two-story,  store and auto center on August 4, 1971.

In 1972, Bay Area Rapid Transit opened Bay Fair station adjacent to the mall to the south, providing access via rapid rail transit.

In 1977, owner Macy's announced a major renovation of the mall. It was enclosed and added escalators, air conditioning and carpeting. On the ground level,  of retail space was added on and a further  atrium and "specialty court" for boutiques and restaurants. On the new second level,  of retail space was added. In a second pase,  of retail space was adjacent to Macy's and  elsewhere. In total,  of space was added for about 40 additional shops, for a total of about 100 shops.

A T.J. Maxx anchor opened April 28, 1994.

Hybrid power center (2000s–present)
In 2001, Montgomery Ward went bankrupt and closed its stores nationwide. The abandoned Ward's store was demolished and in October 2002, a  Target Greatland opened on the site. 

Also In late 2002, the mall was acquired by Chicago-based M & J Wilkow Ltd. The updated shopping center measured . Bayfair's owner planned to remodel the ailing center into an open-air power center, renamed "Bayfair/580," which would have several big-box tenants and upscale "lifestyle-oriented" stores. The plan never came to fruition, however, and the mall was sold to Madison Marquette in late 2003.

The Macy's continues to operate and the mall is enclosed, but by 2012, the other anchors were more typical of those in a power center: big box stores Kohl's, Staples, Old Navy, PetSmart, Bed Bath & Beyond, and 24 Hour Fitness. There was also a Cinemark cinema multiplex. According to the city of San Leandro in a 2016 study, Bayfair has been successful in transforming itself to a tenant mix that meets with current needs.

Plans for transit-oriented village
In 2018, the city of San Leandro adopted a plan to transform the Bay Fair neighborhood, including the mall and areas around it, into a transit-oriented "village", a high-density, mixed-use neighborhood with a street grid of small blocks to encourage walking and cycling, and including small parks and space for community events.

References

External links
"Market Analysis, Bay Fair BART TOD Specific Plan", City of San Leandro, 2016

Shopping malls in the San Francisco Bay Area
Shopping malls in Alameda County, California
San Leandro, California